USS Genesee may refer to the following ships of the United States Navy:

 , launched 2 April 1862 by the Boston Navy Yard
 , built in 1905 by the Maryland Steel Co., Sparrow's Point, Maryland
 , launched 23 September 1943 by Cargill, Inc., Savage, Minnesota

References 

United States Navy ship names